Pablo Casado Blanco (born 1 February 1981) is a Spanish former politician. He was a member of the Congress of Deputies representing Madrid until 4 April 2022, having previously represented Ávila between 2011 and 2019. From 2015 to 2018, he also served as vice secretary general of communication of the People's Party (PP). From July 2018 until April 2022, he was the president of the PP.

Biography

Early life and education 
Casado was born on 1 February 1981 in Palencia. His father, Miguel Casado González, was a doctor and his mother, Esther Blanco Ruiz, a nursing university professor. His family owns an ophthalmologic clinic in his native city. He studied at the Colegio Castilla, managed by the Marist Brothers, and took the 8th year of the General Basic Education (EGB) at Douai School
in the United Kingdom. He has five brothers.

He started his university studies in law at the ICADE (a centre located in Madrid and integrated within the Universidad Pontificia Comillas) in 1999, but he switched to another centre in 2004, enrolling in the CES Cardenal Cisneros, a privately managed centre owned by a foundation of the Community of Madrid and attached (for the purpose of the issuance of the degree) to the public Complutense University of Madrid (UCM). He ultimately obtained his degree in law in the CES Cardenal Cisneros in September 2007 after having reportedly passed half of the credits of the 5-year licenciature in four months of that year.  The centre issued a statement where they denied accusations of impropriety or preferential treatment regarding the student Casado.

He also has a BA in Business Administration and Management and an MA in Administrative Law from the King Juan Carlos University (URJC). The latter degree is a source of significant controversy, as Casado was found to have obtained it from the now controverted School of Administrative Law of that university without ever attending any class, taking any test, and turning in a final dissertation.  An internal investigation by the URJC confirmed that the degrees were legitimate and uncovered no impropriety.

Casado has said that he also earned a postgraduate degree at Harvard University; he had in fact attended a four-day course in 2008 at the Madrid campus of IESE Business School which is allied with Harvard Business School. No academic requirements were needed to attend the course, and attendance was the only requirement for completion.  The Supreme Court of Spain decided in September 2019 that he did not evidently violate laws against prevarication or bribery, but said the matter “could deserve other types of consideration outside criminal law."

Start of political career 
Casado entered politics and joined the People's Party (PP) in 2003 when he was still a student.

He presided over the regional branch of the PP's youth organization in the Community of Madrid, known as the New Generations (NNGG), between 2005 and 2013. He made an initiation journey to Cuba in early 2007 (similar to the 2012 travel by his right-hand in the Madrilenian NNGG Ángel Carromero), where he met with Cuban dissidents such as Oswaldo Payá. He left written testimony of it in pieces published in Libertad Digital and El Mundo.

In 2007, he was included as candidate in the PP list for the election to the Assembly of Madrid; he became a member of the 8th term of the regional legislature (in June), where he held the functions of spokesman in the parliamentary Commission of Justice and Public Administrations and assistant spokesman in the Commission of Budget and Finance.

He resigned as regional legislator in July 2009. In June 2009 Casado married Isabel Torres Orts; the couple have a daughter Paloma and a son Pablo. Isabel Torres is from a wealthy industrial family in Elche, and works as a psychologist in a private clinic in Madrid.

Between 2009 and 2012 he directed the office of former Prime Minister José María Aznar. During this period, in 2010, he became one of the founders (along with Carlos Bustelo, Rafael Bardají and Enrique Navarro Gil) of the Friends of Israel Initiative think tank.

National MP 

He was included as candidate in the PP list for the constituency of Ávila in the November 2011 general election and became a member of the Congress of Deputies. He was subsequently re-elected in the 2015 and 2016 general elections.

He was designated spokesman of the Campaign Committee of the PP for the local and regional elections of May 2015. Later, in June 2015, he was appointed vice secretary general of communication of the PP by the party president Mariano Rajoy.

On 9 October 2017, Casado made a comment about the former President of Catalonia, Carles Puigdemont, alluding that should Puigdemont declare Catalan independence, he could end up like Lluís Companys, who was imprisoned by the Spanish Second Republic. His words were used by some Catalan nationalists to suggest that he referred to Companys' execution by Franco's regime in 1940, although Casado stated he was referring to his imprisonment by the democratic Second Republic.

19th PP National Congress 

After the motion of no confidence, Mariano Rajoy resigned from the leadership of the PP, Pablo Casado ran as pre-candidate to the primary election to the presidency of the party. He introduced himself as a (potential) leader intending to "recover" voters from Citizens and Vox.

He obtained the second most votes out of 6 candidates after Soraya Sáenz de Santamaría, former Deputy Prime Minister of Spain, who received the most votes among the party members with a margin of 1,500 votes. On July 21, 2018, during the 19th Extraordinary National Congress of the PP, a final vote among 3,082 party delegates was held in order to decide the new leader of the PP between Sáenz de Santamaría and Casado.

He won the voting among the delegates with 1,701 votes (57,2%) versus 1,250 (42%) votes to Sáenz de Santamaría out of 2,973 votes, being proclaimed as the new president, in what was considered a party swing towards the right.

2019 election
In response to a budget defeat, Prime Minister Pedro Sánchez dissolved the Cortes Generales, giving Casado an early test of his leadership, which was also in the aftermath of the first right-of-centre government in Andalucia.
The election results proved disappointing for Casado, his party losing over half of their seats in the Cortes Generales, with Albert Rivera's Citizens, overtaking them as the foremost party of the centre-right in many regions of Spain, and the new far-right Vox also taking a significant number of voters. A major loss, was the member for Álava, and the 2019 election campaign manager, Javier Maroto, who not only lost his seat in the Basque country to EH Bildu, but was fired for his responsibility for PP's defeat. Casado refused to resign, but many members' worries of the "suicide" that was his controversial leadership, have been confirmed in light of the defeat, as he has now U-turned back to the political centre, placing much of the blame of the loss on Cs and Vox, for splintering the vote.

Casado adopted an active role during the COVID-19 lockdown, refraining from restricting public activities, visiting disparate locations such as Mercamadrid, a hotel, a sheep farm and the headquarters of the association of vehicle producers; he proceeded to criticise the Government of Spain from those platforms. In May 2020 he established  abstention on the vote on the extension of the State of Alarm as the party line.

Leadership challenges
His leadership of the PP was challenged in 2022 by Isabel Díaz Ayuso, the popular president of the community of Madrid, leading to a violent internal conflict. The latter went so far as to accuse Casado of maneuvering to "destroy" her. A large number of PP leaders and activists demanded Casado resign, but he refused. The president of Galicia, Alberto Núñez Feijóo, considered the most respected figure in the PP, said that "the situation is unsustainable. Pablo Casado's reign is coming to an end. We have to make difficult decisions." Casado resigned as PP leader and an MP on 4 April, and was replaced as party leader by Feijóo.

Political positions 

He has been described as neoconservative, as well as close to José María Aznar and Esperanza Aguirre. He describes himself as liberal-conservative. According to José Luis Villacañas, Casado's discourse incorporates several of the core tenets of the Spanish right, including an emphasis on Catholicism, the secondary role of women, a stress on the unity of the Spanish nation, anti-abortion views, and Atlanticism. According to Antonio Elorza, Casado's ascension represents the comeback of the reactionary PP in the name of principles and fidelity to political lineage: the family as a totem, a fiscal counterreform, a heavy hand in Catalonia, a preventively repressive legislation and Franco's corpse remaining at Valle de los Caídos. 

In October 2017, he vouched (on a personal basis) for a potential reform of the Organic Law of Political Parties which would include the illegalization of political parties promoting the independence (of a part of Spain).

Annoyed by the decision of a German court to grant the extradition of Puigdemont to Spain solely for the charge of embezzlement in July 2018 (which he branded as "humiliation"), he raised the possibility of abolishing the Schengen Area. In September 2018 he directly ordered the PP members of the European Parliament to abstain in the voting of the Sargentini report calling for triggering Article 7 proceedings against the Hungarian government of Viktor Orbán.

Also in July 2018, he inveighed against "gender ideology", which he described as a form of "social collectivism the centre-right must fight against". He is also critical of the right of abortion as well as euthanasia.
 
On 21 July 2018, in the National Congress of the PP, he vowed to "reconquer the Catalan people". Referencing Tabarnia, a hypothetical anti-independentist breakaway from Catalonia, he said that he would be "turning the hypothetical Tabarnia into a real Tabarnia".

He has declared the "Hispanidad" to be the mankind's greatest feat, only comparable to romanization. According to Elorza, in his message, void of any criticism, Casado recovers the formulation of the concept of Hispanidad of the 1930s and reaffirms a particular idea of Spain, in which history, turned into a mechanism of exaltation, is used to propel a nationalist mobilization.

The use by Casado of terminology such as accusing NGOs of being "human traffickers" while also criticizing a perceived "do-goodism" in the Sánchez Government regarding its migration policy has drawn comparisons to Italian deputy prime minister Matteo Salvini by Steven Forti, of the Rolling Stone magazine.

He also said that action for the historical memory of Francisco Franco's crimes should be brough about by consensus, and that Spain should concentrate on problems of the present, not the past.

A monarchist, he vocally defended the institution and proclaimed "I will always defend the King of Spain" in 2018 while he announced his opposition to opening a parliamentary commission aiming to investigate the irregularities allegedly committed by King emeritus Juan Carlos I that Corinna zu Sayn-Wittgenstein revealed. He has also considered as good move forward getting used to include praises to the King of Spain in everyday conversations and deemed acts such as paying the pensions as a figurated way of saying Viva el Rey ("Long live the King").

On 20 November 2021, he attended a special mass in Granada in the honour of the former Spanish dictator Francisco Franco on the anniversary of his death. The Francisco Franco National Foundation publicly thanked Casado's attendance. The only explanation given by his political party was that he did not know what the mass was about, despite Franco flags and symbols being present in the church.

On the economic front, he promises to eliminate taxes on wealth, inheritance and gifts, and to lower income and corporate taxes.

Electoral history

Explanatory notes

Citations 

|-

|-

1981 births
Politicians from Castile and León
Conservatism in Spain
Leaders of political parties in Spain
Living people
Members of the 10th Congress of Deputies (Spain)
Members of the 11th Congress of Deputies (Spain)
Members of the 12th Congress of Deputies (Spain)
Members of the 13th Congress of Deputies (Spain)
Members of the 14th Congress of Deputies (Spain)
Members of the 8th Assembly of Madrid
Members of the People's Parliamentary Group (Assembly of Madrid)
People from Palencia
People's Party (Spain) politicians
Spanish nationalists
Spanish Roman Catholics